Leucadendron sericeum, the Wabooms conebush, is a flower-bearing shrub belonging to the genus Leucadendron and forms part of the fynbos. The plant is native to the Western Cape, South Africa.

Description
The plant dies after a fire but the seeds survive. The seeds are stored in a toll on the female plant and only fall to the ground where they are spread by ants after two months, after the fruit has ripened. The plant is unisexual and there are separate plants with male and female flowers, which are pollinated by small insects.

Distribution and habitat
The plant occurs at the Wabooms River in the Kouebokkeveld Mountains.

References

 
 
 

sericeum
Taxa named by Carl Peter Thunberg
Plants described in 1810